Hoogezand-Sappemeer is a former municipality in the Northeastern Netherlands. It was the third most-populous municipality in the province of Groningen, after Groningen and Oldambt. It was formed in 1949 by the merger of the former municipalities of Hoogezand (well-known for its ship building industry) and Sappemeer. On 1 January 2018, Hoogezand-Sappemeer merged with Slochteren and Menterwolde, forming the new municipality Midden-Groningen.

Geography 
Population centres in the municipality were:

 Achterdiep
 Borgercompagnie
 Borgweg
 Foxham
 Foxhol
 Foxholsterbosch
 Hoogezand
 Jagerswijk
 Kalkwijk
 Kiel-Windeweer
 Kleinemeer
 Kropswolde
 Lula
 Martenshoek
 Meerwijck
 Nieuwe Compagnie
 Sappemeer
 Tripscompagnie
 Waterhuizen
 Westerbroek
 Wolfsbarge

Transportation 

The A7 motorway (European Highway E 22, Amsterdam-Groningen-Germany) crosses the municipality. There is also a railway line providing service to Groningen and Nieuweschans/Leer(Germany). Trains serve four stations in the municipality, Kropswolde, Martenshoek, Hoogezand-Sappemeer, and Sappemeer Oost. Since 2007, trains will stop 4 times an hour.

References

External links
 Official website
 

Midden-Groningen
Former municipalities of Groningen (province)
Municipalities of the Netherlands disestablished in 2018